In computing, the Netscape Portable Runtime, or NSPR, a platform abstraction library, makes all operating systems it supports appear the same to (for example) Mozilla-style web-browsers. NSPR provides platform independence for non-GUI operating system facilities. These facilities include:
 threads
 thread synchronization
 normal file and network I/O
 interval timing and calendar time
 basic memory management (malloc and free)
 shared library linking.

Much of the library, and perhaps the overall thrust of it in the Gromit environment, provides the underpinnings of the Java virtual machine, more or less mapping the sys layer that Sun defines for the porting of the Java VM to various platforms. NSPR does go beyond that requirement in some areas, as it also functions as the platform-independent layer for most of the servers produced by Netscape.

History 
The first generation of NSPR originally aimed just to satisfy the requirements of porting Java to various host environments. NSPR20, an effort started in 1996, built on that original idea, though very little remains of the original code. (The "20" in "NSPR20" does not mean "version 2.0" but rather "second generation".) Many of the concepts show reform, expansion, and maturation. In 2009, NSPR still functioned appropriately as the platform-dependent layer under Java, but it also served in supporting clients written entirely in C or in C++.

How it works 
NSPR has the goal of providing uniform service over a wide range of operating-system environments. It strives not to export the lowest common denominator, but to exploit the best features of each operating system on which it runs, while still providing a uniform service across a wide range of host offerings.

Threads 
Threads feature prominently in NSPR. The software industry's offering of threads lacks consistency. NSPR, while far from perfect, does provide a single API to which clients may program and expect reasonably consistent behavior. The operating systems provide everything from no concept of threading at all up to and including sophisticated, scalable and efficient implementations. NSPR makes as much use of what the systems offer as it can. NSPR aims to impose as little overhead as possible in accessing those appropriate system features.

Thread synchronization 
Thread synchronization loosely depends on monitors as described by C. A. R. Hoare in "Monitors: An operating system structuring concept", Communications of the ACM, 17(10), October 1974 and then formalized by Xerox' Mesa programming language ("Mesa Language Manual", J.G. Mitchell et al., Xerox PARC, CSL-79-3 (Apr 1979)). This mechanism provides the basic mutual exclusion (mutex) and thread notification facilities (condition variables) implemented by NSPR. Additionally, NSPR provides synchronization methods more suited for use by Java. The Java-like facilities include monitor reentrancy, implicit and tightly bound notification capabilities with the ability to associate the synchronization objects dynamically.

I/O 
NSPR's I/O slightly augments the Berkeley sockets model and allows arbitrary layering. The designers originally intended to export synchronous I/O methods only, relying on threads to provide the concurrency needed for complex applications. That method of operation remains preferred, though one can configure the network I/O channels as non-blocking in the traditional sense.

Network addresses 
Part of NSPR deals with manipulation of network addresses. NSPR defines an IP-centric network address object. While it does not define the object as opaque, the API provides methods that allow and encourage clients to treat the addresses as polymorphic items. In this area NSPR aims to provide a migration path between IPv4 and IPv6. To that end one can perform translations of ASCII strings (DNS names) into NSPR's network address structures, regardless of whether the addressing technology uses IPv4 or IPv6.

Time 
NSPR makes timing facilities available in two forms: interval timing and calendar functions.

Interval timers are based on a free running, 32-bit, platform-dependent resolution timer. Such timers are normally used to specify timeouts on I/O, waiting on condition variables and other rudimentary thread scheduling. Since these timers have finite namespace and are free running, they can wrap at any time. NSPR does not provide an epoch, but expects clients to deal with that issue. The granularity of the timers is guaranteed to be between 10 microseconds and 1 millisecond. This allows a minimal timer period in of approximately 12 hours. But in order to deal with the wrap-around issue, only half that namespace may be used. Therefore, the minimal usable interval available from the timers is slightly less than six hours.

Calendar times are 64-bit signed numbers with units of microseconds. The epoch for calendar times is midnight, January 1, 1970, Greenwich Mean Time. Negative times extend to times before 1970, and positive numbers forward. Use of 64 bits allows a representation of times approximately in the range of −30000 to the year 30000. There exits a structural representation (i.e., exploded view), routines to acquire the current time from the host system, and convert them to and from the 64-bit and structural representation. Additionally there are routines to convert to and from most well-known forms of ASCII into the 64-bit NSPR representation.

Memory management 
NSPR provides API to perform the basic malloc, calloc, realloc and free functions. Depending on the platform, the functions may be implemented almost entirely in the NSPR runtime or simply shims that call immediately into the host operating system's offerings.

Linking 
Support for linking (shared library loading and unloading) forms part of NSPR's feature set. In most cases this is simply a smoothing over of the facilities offered by the various platform providers.

See also 

 Apache Portable Runtime
 Adaptive Communication Environment
 Cross-platform support middleware

References

External links
 Official website
 NSPR source code

Application programming interfaces
Mozilla
Netscape